The 1st constituency of Haute-Corse is a French legislative constituency in the Haute-Corse département, taking in the most northerly part of Corsica.

Deputies

Election results

2022

 
 
|-
| colspan="8" bgcolor="#E9E9E9"|
|-

2017

2012

2007

References

Sources
 *
 

1